Elm City Express is a men's soccer club based in New Haven, Connecticut that most recently competed in the National Premier Soccer League. The club's colors are blue and white, and plays its home matches at Jess Dow Field at Southern Connecticut State University.  The ownership group of Elm City Express also owns and operates Clube Atlético Tubarão, a Brazilian soccer club based in Santa Catarina, which competes in the lower levels of Brazil's pyramid.

History
Elm City Express was founded in 2017 by Zack Henry.

In their inaugural season, The Express won the 2017 NPSL Championship by defeating Midland-Odessa FC 5–0 on August 12, 2017, at Reese Stadium in New Haven.

In January 2019, Elm City announced they would be taking a hiatus for the 2019 season and Zack Henry would no longer be president of the team.

Front office
 Luiz Henrique Martins Ribeiro – vice president
 Brian Neumeyer – general manager
 Eric Da Costa – technical director

Year-by-year

Honors
National Premier Soccer League
National Playoffs
Champions: 2017
Northeast Region
Champions: 2017
Atlantic Blue Conference
Champions: 2017

Notable players
Joshua Calderón, defender; Puerto Rico men's national team
Matt Jones; goalkeeper; assistant coach of the Quinnipiac Bobcats

See also
 Hartford City FC

References

External links
 

2017 establishments in Connecticut
Association football clubs established in 2017
Defunct soccer clubs in Connecticut
National Premier Soccer League teams
Sports in New Haven, Connecticut